Eugoa incerta is a moth of the family Erebidae. It is found on Sulawesi.

References

 Natural History Museum Lepidoptera generic names catalog

incerta
Moths described in 1946